The Slovenian Water Polo Championship is a water polo league in Slovenia. The league was formed in 1991 with the dissolution of the Yugoslav First League of Water Polo.

List of winners

Number of titles

References

Water polo competitions in Slovenia
Slovenia
Sports leagues in Slovenia
Sports leagues established in 1991
1991 establishments in Slovenia